The British 6th Destroyer Flotilla, or Sixth Destroyer Flotilla, was a military formation of the Royal Navy from 1911 to 1939 and again from 1947 to 1951

History
The flotilla was formed in 1911 at Portsmouth, with its first commander, Captain Mortimer Silver,  being appointed in 1912. During World War 1 it was based at Dover, forming the fighting nucleus of the Dover Patrol commanded by Rear-Admiral Reginald Bacon.

The flotilla was disbanded in 1939. It was reformed in October 1947 as part of the Home Fleet until 1951. In 1952 it was re-designated 6th Destroyer Squadron. Its final commander was Captain Victor Danckwerts.

Administration

Captains (D) afloat, 6th Destroyer Flotilla
Captain (D) afloat is a Royal Navy appointment of an operational commander of a destroyer flotilla or squadron.

References

Sources
  Vol. 1 • Vol. 2
 Harley, Simon; Lovell, Tony. (2018) "Sixth Destroyer Flotilla (Royal Navy) - The Dreadnought Project". www.dreadnoughtproject.org. Harley and Lovell.
 Whitby, Michael (2011). Commanding Canadians: The Second World War Diaries of A.F.C. Layard. Vancouver, Canada: UBC Press. .
 White, Michael (2015). Australian Submarines Vol 2: 2nd Edition: a History Vol 2 (in Arabic). Sydney, Australia: Australian Teachers of Media. .

External links

Destroyer flotillas of the Royal Navy
Military units and formations established in 1911
Military units and formations disestablished in 1939